West Alaska Lake, is a small lake in Central Kewaunee County, Wisconsin. The lake is home to bluegill, brook trout, largemouth bass and rainbow trout. The lake shares the area with its larger neighbor, East Alaska Lake because of that the lake is a popular fishing destination.

References

 General lake information

Lakes of Kewaunee County, Wisconsin